Work of Art is a 1934 novel by Sinclair Lewis. The novel's protagonist is Myron Weagle, who aspires to climb the ladder of the American lodging industry, and forms a "composite picture" of the hotel/inn/caravanserie landscape of the earth 20th-century. Upon its release, the New York Times called it "renewed evidence of [Lewis'] vitality", but also of his "essential shortcomings as a truly first-rate creative writer."

References

Novels by Sinclair Lewis
1934 novels